Kevin Curren and David Pate were the defending champions, but lost in the first round to tournament winners John McEnroe and Mark Woodforde.

McEnroe and Woodforde won the title by defeating Peter Doohan and Jim Grabb 6–4, 6–4 in the final.

This tournament saw an unusual event, as all seeded pairs were eliminated in the first round.

Seeds

Draw

Draw

External links
 Official results archive (ATP)
 Official results archive (ITF)

Los Angeles Open (tennis)
1988 Grand Prix (tennis)
Volvo Tennis Los Angeles
Volvo Tennis Los Angeles